La Celle-en-Morvan is a commune in the Saône-et-Loire department in the region of Bourgogne-Franche-Comté in eastern France.

See also
 Communes of the Saône-et-Loire department
Parc naturel régional du Morvan

References

Communes of Saône-et-Loire